Imma spanista is a moth of the family Immidae. It was described by Edward Meyrick in 1930. It is found on New Guinea and Papua New Guinea.

References

Immidae
Moths described in 1930
Moths of New Guinea
Taxa named by Edward Meyrick